FasTrak is the electronic toll collection (ETC) system used in the state of California in the United States. The system is used statewide on all of the toll roads, toll bridges, and high-occupancy toll lanes along the California Freeway and Expressway System.

As with other ETC systems, FasTrak is designed to eliminate the need for cars to stop to pay at toll booths, thus decreasing the traffic congestion traditionally associated with toll roads. Its use of technology to improve transit is in line with the U.S. Department of Transportation's Intelligent Transportation Systems initiative.

Under California's government structure, the state's toll facilities are operated by various agencies and special-purpose districts. Concerned that they would each introduce different, incompatible ETC systems, the California State Legislature passed Senate Bill 1523 in 1990, requiring the California Department of Transportation (Caltrans) to develop a statewide specification that all these toll agencies were required to meet. Three years later, Transportation Corridor Agencies opened the Foothill Toll Road in Orange County, implementing the statewide ETC system for the first time, and naming it FasTrak. The state continues to delegate the responsibility of selling and maintaining FasTrak accounts to the different toll agencies.

Operations and functionality

Technology

Under California law, Caltrans was given the mandate to develop and maintain an open, statewide ETC specification. This specification is known in the transportation industry as "Title 21" after it was added to Title 21 of the California Code of Regulations. FasTrak uses RFID technology near 915 MHz to read data from a transponder placed in a vehicle (usually mounted by Velcro strips to the windshield) moving at speeds that may exceed 70 mph (112 km/h). The RFID transponder in each vehicle is associated with a prepaid debit account; each time the vehicle passes underneath a toll collection site, the account is debited to pay the toll.

Currently, FasTrak transponders are not compatible with E-ZPass and other ETC systems used in other states because they use a different specification than Title 21. If a vehicle does not have a transponder, or if a transponder is not detected at the toll plaza, a violation enforcement system triggers cameras that capture photos of the vehicle and its license plate for processing. If the license plate is registered as belonging to a FasTrak user, the account is debited only the toll charge, and no penalty is charged. This is a backup in case a transponder fails to read. Otherwise, a toll violation notice is sent to the registered owner of the vehicle. In the case of drivers whose vehicles are company owned or leased, as long as the vehicle license plates are properly listed, the violations will be sent to the registered owner and not the employee driver. It is for this reason that the License Agreement mandates that customers list all vehicles, including motorcycles, motor homes, and trailers of all types on their accounts so that when transponders fail to read the toll can be debited based upon the vehicle's license plate. A license plate may be listed only on one account.

A toll collected based on a license plate is called an image toll and can be identified on the customer statement by noticing the license plate number listed instead of the transponder number. If one fails to correctly list license plates on their account, the FasTrak customer will receive toll violation notices as if they were another driver. If a FasTrak customer receives a toll violation notice under these circumstances, they only refer to the reverse side of the Toll Violation notice and complete the section at the bottom of the notice that will add the new vehicle to their account. Conversely, a license plate should be removed from an account after a change in ownership, otherwise resulting in paying for another driver's tolls via the Image Toll process.

Toll agencies
The California Toll Operators Committee (CTOC) helps coordinates the interoperability among the state's toll agencies and facilities. The CTOC's members include:
 Alameda County Transportation Commission, operator of the high-occupancy toll lanes in Alameda County.
 Bay Area Toll Authority, operator of the seven state-owned toll bridges in the San Francisco Bay Area.
 California Department of Transportation (Caltrans), maintains the state highway system and coordinates with the other toll agencies, but does not necessarily plan and operate the toll facilities directly.
 Golden Gate Bridge, Highway and Transportation District, operator of the Golden Gate Bridge.
 Los Angeles County Metropolitan Transportation Authority, operator of the high-occupancy toll lanes in Los Angeles County under the brand name Metro ExpressLanes.
 Orange County Transportation Authority, co-operator of the 91 Express Lanes.
 Riverside County Transportation Commission, co-operator of the 91 Express Lanes, as well as the operator of the high-occupancy toll lanes in Riverside County under the brand name Riverside Express.
 San Bernardino County Transportation Authority, will be the operator of the future high-occupancy toll lanes in San Bernardino County.
 San Diego Association of Governments (SANDAG), operator of the toll facilities in San Diego County.
 San Francisco County Transportation Authority, will be the operator of any future congestion pricing tolling facility on Treasure Island, Yerba Buena Island, or other areas in the City and County of San Francisco.
 San Mateo County Express Lanes Joint Powers Authority, operator of the high-occupancy toll lanes in San Mateo County.
 Santa Clara Valley Transportation Authority (VTA), operator of the high-occupancy toll lanes in Santa Clara County.
 Sunol SMART Carpool Lane Joint Powers Authority, operator of the I-680 Sunol Express Lanes that span Alameda and Santa Clara counties.
 Transportation Corridor Agencies, operator of the toll roads in Orange County.

Service center operations
For convenience, all toll agencies in the San Francisco Bay Area share the same billing and customer service center. The 91 Express Lanes, operated by Orange and Riverside counties, has a separate billing and customer service center. Every other toll agency in Southern California also has their own billing and customer service center. Although anybody with a FasTrak transponder can use it to pay tolls on any California toll facility using the system, people are encouraged to open their accounts with the local agency in charge of the one that they use the most. Each center establishes its own fee and discount structures, and people may be charged a fee if the majority of their FasTrak use occurs elsewhere.

Fees
Each FasTrak account agency has its own monthly minimums / monthly fees (from lowest to highest)

Tag types

The standard FasTrak transponder tag can be used by most vehicles. Transportation Corridor Agencies (TCA) also offers a sticker transponder that has the same functionality as a standard one.

For those traveling on the HOT express lanes in the Bay Area, in Riverside County, or the Los Angeles Metro ExpressLanes and want the carpooling discounts, they will need a switchable "FasTrak Flex" transponder. These devices include a switch that indicates the number of occupants (1, 2, or 3 or more) in the vehicle. This enables the open road tolling system to automatically compute the carpool or solo driver toll. The Bay Area toll bridges and the 91 Express Lanes instead have designated carpool lanes, so any tag type can be used (although both the 91 Express Lanes and TCA agencies also offer the switchable FasTrak Flex tags to its users if they want to use the Los Angeles or Riverside County express lanes too).

For eligible clean air vehicles (CAVs) registered with the California DMV, the Bay Area FasTrak center and Riverside County HOT express lanes also offer a special "FasTrak CAV" tag for those who qualify for those discounts on applicable toll facilities. Other toll agencies may instead offer a special account for registered clean air vehicles on their HOT express lanes.

For the I-15 Express Lanes in San Diego County, SANDAG only offers the standard FasTrak transponder, and instead instructs drivers that they can "declare" that they are a carpool or a registered CAV (and thus do not have to pay a toll) by removing their transponder from the windshield or covering their tag in the provided mylar bag.

Neither the Orange County toll roads operated by the TCA nor the South Bay Expressway toll road in San Diego County offer carpooling or CAV discounts.

Retail availability
The Bay Area FasTrak center, Metro ExpressLanes, and SANDAG offer a packaged FasTrak transponder sold over-the-counter at a retail setting, such as nearby Costco locations. Customers must still register their transponders with the issuing agency.

Security

A teardown analysis of the transponder and analysis of its security issues was published at Black Hat 2008. They are updated remotely, and do not use encryption. Furthermore, FasTrak's basic functionality and specifications are listed under Title 21, Division 2, Chapter 16 of the California Code of Regulations, and are thus freely accessible to the general public.

FasTrak units are used to generate 5-1-1 traffic data, using sensors and antennae placed across various freeways.

History
As the first ETC system in North America was installed on the Dallas North Tollway in 1989, many California toll facilities started to express interest in the technology. Because the state's toll roads and bridges are run by different government agencies, there was the possibility that a number of different incompatible ETC systems would be instituted throughout California. Therefore, the California State Legislature passed Senate Bill 1523 in 1990, requiring
Caltrans, the state's Department of Transportation, to develop a statewide technical specification which all systems would be required to meet. As a result, California was the first in the nation to require all of its toll bridges and roads to use the same ETC system. This technical specification was later codified in Title 21, Division 2, Chapter 16 of the California Code of Regulations.

When the Foothill Toll Road in Orange County opened in 1993, it became the first California toll facility to use an ETC system. Transportation Corridor Agencies (TCA), the local agency in charge of the toll road, named the system "FasTrak".
To this day, TCA still holds the trademark to the "FasTrak" name and logo.

When TCA first introduced the FasTrak system, the electronic transponders consisted of a gadget about the size of a Walkman in which a smart card was inserted.
However, the smart cards were unpopular with both tollway officials and users because they cost more, offered little advantage, and customers were charged with a $10 annual fee (which has since been discontinued).
By the time the 91 Express Lanes opened in 1995, the FasTrak transponders were redesigned to be the size of a coaster that could be mounted by Velcro strips to the windshield.

TCA later deployed the FasTrak system to the two other toll roads they administer as soon as they opened: the San Joaquin Hills Toll Road in 1996 and the Eastern Toll Road in 1998. Also in 1998, the system was then deployed on the high-occupancy toll (HOT) lanes along Interstate 15 in San Diego.

However, the system had to be modified so that it could be used on California's toll bridges. After a test run on the Carquinez Bridge in 1996, it had accuracy problems in dealing with the 18 different toll classifications for different kinds of trucks.
After the changes were made and another test run, the Carquinez Bridge became the first California toll bridge to use FasTrak in 1997. However, bureaucratic inaction, technical difficulties, and financial mismanagement delayed the deployment of the system to the other six state-run toll bridges in the San Francisco Bay Area until October 2000. Meanwhile, the Golden Gate Bridge, run by the independent Golden Gate Bridge, Highway and Transportation District, installed their system a few months earlier in July of that year. The FasTrak system was also briefly used on the state-owned San Diego-Coronado Bridge until tolls were discontinued on that structure in 2002. The Bay Area FasTrak Customer Center then opened in 2005, merging the service center for the state's Bay Area bridges with the one that was being operated separately by the Golden Gate Bridge District.

Since then, several other new toll facilities around California have either opened, are under construction, or are in the planning stages. They are all required to accept FasTrak as per the aforementioned state law.

In 2009, San Francisco International Airport began accepting FasTrak in all of its parking garages, including long-term parking. Currently only FasTrak accounts opened from either the Bay Area FasTrak Customer Center or from Transportation Corridor Agencies can be used at the airport.

When the Metro ExpressLanes opened in Los Angeles in late 2012, it introduced FasTrak transponders with a special switch that indicates the number of occupants (1, 2, or 3 or more) in the vehicle. This enables the open road tolling system to automatically compute the carpool or solo driver toll, as well as allow the California Highway Patrol to visually check to see if there are more or fewer people in the car than indicated on the transponder. For the convenience of their FasTrak customers in the Greater Los Angeles urban area who may also use the Metro ExpressLanes, TCA began offering switchable transponders in 2013, and the 91 Express Lanes followed suit by 2015. With the switchable transponders, the violation rate on the Metro ExpressLanes fell to 10 percent from the 20 to 25 percent cheating rate in toll lanes that do not require transponders for carpoolers, prompting Alameda County officials to include the system on the then-planned I-580 Express Lanes. The Bay Area FasTrak Customer Center then started to offer switchable transponders, under the name "FasTrak Flex", in summer 2015. For the HOT lanes in San Diego, drivers can "declare" that they are a carpool (and thus do not have to pay a toll) by covering their FasTrak transponder in a mylar bag.

There has been a push to strictly use open road tolling, accepting only payments via a FasTrak transponder, a toll-by-plate account, or one-time payments via online or by phone instead of cash. All of California's HOT lanes only use open road tolling. The Golden Gate Bridge began requiring electronic payments for all tolls in March 2013, and all the Orange County toll roads run by TCA likewise did the same in May 2014. A plan to also eliminate toll takers on all seven of the state-owned bridges was approved in 2019. On March 20, 2020, at midnight, due to the COVID-19 pandemic, all-electronic tolling was temporarily placed in effect for those seven state-owned toll bridges, and since 2021, all of them are now permanently cashless. The only toll facility that still accepts cash is the South Bay Expressway in San Diego County, but it uses unstaffed toll booths with cash machines that require exact change.

Under MAP-21, passed by the Federal government in 2012, all ETC facilities in the United States must reach some form of interoperability by October 1, 2016. In response, the California State Legislature passed Assembly Bill 493 in 2013, authorizing Caltrans and the state's various toll agencies to help develop compatible systems. However, the deadline, which had neither penalty nor funding attached, was not met. California regulators later approved a phase-in of transponder technology using the ISO/IEC 18000-63 (6C) standard, released in 2004, which began in 2018 and is expected to end in 2024. This would allow compatibility with systems used in nearby states of Washington, Colorado, and Utah; and also Kentucky, Indiana, Georgia, North Carolina, and Louisiana, plus NationalPass.

In 2019, TCA introduced a sticker transponder to replace the former plastic transponder. The sticker transponder is similar to the eGo Plus toll sticker introduced by TxTag in 2005, SunPass Mini toll sticker introduced by SunPass in 2008, and the sticker tag introduced by MnPASS in 2015.

Toll facilities using FasTrak

Current
^ indicates that carpools require the switchable "FasTrak Flex" transponder.
HOV 2+ indicates that carpools require two or more persons.
HOV 3+ indicates that carpools require three or more persons.
† indicates that two-person carpools are tolled differently than those with three or more.

Planned or proposed facilities
The following is a partial list of toll facilities that are either in the planning or proposal stages (sorted by highway number):

References

External links
FasTrak account agencies
Bay Area FasTrak Customer Service Center—handles accounts for all toll facilities in the San Francisco Bay Area
SANDAG FasTrak—administers the toll facilities in San Diego County
91 Express Lanes
Transportation Corridor Agencies—administers the Orange County toll roads
Metro ExpressLanes
Riverside Express—administers the Riverside County Transportation Commission's Express Lanes

Other links
 FasTrak Throughout California: California Toll Operators Committee
 Golden Gate Bridge official web site
 Alameda County Express Lanes—operated by the Alameda County Transportation Commission
 San Mateo County Express Lanes
 Silicon Valley Express Lanes—operated by the Santa Clara Valley Transportation Authority

Electronic toll collection
Road transportation in California